This is a list of towns and villages in Hartford County, Connecticut.

A
Addison
Alsop Corner
Avon (Town)
Avon Park North
Avon Park South

B
Bahre Corner
Bell Air
Bellin Terrace
Bensted Corner
Berlin (Town) 
Birchwood
Bishop's Corner (a neighborhood of West Hartford) 
Bloomfield (Town) 
Blue Hills (a village of Bloomfield) 
Brainerd Park
Breakneck
Bristol (City) 
Broad Acres
Broad Brook
Brookhaven Village
Buckingham
Buckland
Bull Run Corner
Burlington (Town)
Burnham
Burnside

C
Canton (Town)
Canton Center
Canton Valley
Carroll Corners
Case Corner
Chatsworth Village
Cherry Park
Children's Village of the Hartford Orphan Asylum
Coachlight Village
Collinsville (a village of Canton) 
Colonial Mobile Home Park
Corbin Heights Housing
Cottage Farms
Cottage Grove
Cotton Hollow
Crowleys Corner

D
Dutch Point Colony

E
East Berlin
East Bristol
East Farmington Heights
East Glastonbury
East Granby (Town) 
East Hartford (Town) 
East Hartford Gardens
East Hartland (a village of Hartland)
East Plymouth
East Side
East Windsor Hill 
Ebbs Corner
Edgewood
Elm Hill
Elmwood (a neighborhood of West Hartford)  
Elmwood Acres
Enfield (Town)

F
Farmingdale Village
Farmington (Town) 
Farmington Station
Farnhams
Fernridge Place
Firetown
Five Points
Flax Hill Elderly Housing
Floydville
Foote Corners
Forbes Village
Forest Village
Forestville (a section of Bristol) 
Four Corners

G
Glastonbury (Town) 
Glastonbury Center
Glenwood Homes
Goodrichville
Granbrook Park
Granby (Town) 
Green Manor Village
Griswoldville

H
Halladay Corner
Hampsted
Hartford (City) 
Hartland (Town)
Hathewood
Hayden
Hazardville (a section of Enfield)
Highland Park
Higley Village
Hilliardville
Hockanum
Hopewell
Hoskins
Huckleberry Hills Trails
Hungary

K
Keeney Park
Kensington (a section of Berlin)
Kew Gardens
Kings Corner

L
Lamson Corner
Liberty Mobile Home Park
Lovely Street
Lydallville

M
Manchester (Town) 
Manchester Green
Marion (a section of Southington)
Marlborough (Town) 
Mayberry Village
McKinley Park
Meadowgate
Mechanicsville
Melrose
Mill Pond Village
Milldale (a section of Southington)
Moravia Woods
Mount Pleasant Housing

N
New Britain (City) 
Newington (Town) 
Newington Junction
North Bloomfield
North Canton
North End
North Granby (a village of Granby)
North Hollow
North Thompsonville

O
Oakland
Oakland Gardens
Oakland Hills
Old Avon Village
Orford Village
Oxford Village

P
Parkville
Pegville
Pequabuck
Pine Hill
Pinnacle Heights Housing
Plainville (Town)
Plantsville (a section of Southington)
Poquonock (a village of Windsor)
Pratts Corner
Prospect Heights

R
Rainbow
Rising Corner
River Glen
Rivermead Mobile Home Park
Rocky Hill (Town)
Roland Heights

S
Salmon Brook
Saybrooke Village
Scantic
Scitico
Shaker Pines
Sherwood Manor
Silvermine Acres
Simsbury (Town)  
Smith Tower Housing
South Glastonbury
South Side Park
South Wethersfield
South Windsor (Town) 
Southington (Town)  
Southwood Acres
Spoonville
Spring Village
Stillmans Corner
Stowe Village Housing Project
Suffield (Town) 
Suffield Depot (a village of Suffield)

T
Tariffville (a village of Simsbury) 
Tariffville Center
Taylor Town
Terramuggus (a village of Marlborough)
The Gables
Thompsonville (a village of Enfield)
Thralltown
Timber Village
Tootin' Hills
Tudor Village
Turkey Hill

U
Unionville

V
Victory Heights

W
Wapping
Wapping Mews Elderly Housing
Warehouse Point
Weatogue (a village of Simsbury) 
Welles Village
Wells Quarter Village
West Avon
West District
West Granby (a village of Granby)  
West Hartford (Town) 
West Hartland (a village of Hartland)
West Hill
West Simsbury (a village of Simsbury) 
West Suffield
Westfield Heights
Westmoor Park
Wethersfield 
Whigville
Whitings Corner
Wilson (a village of Windsor)
Windmill Springs
Windsor (Town)  
Windsor Locks (Town) 
Windsorville
Wintonbury Hill
Woodland

 
Connecticut, Hartford County
Connecticut, Hartford County
Hartford County